Sour Lake is a city in Hardin County, Texas, United States. The population was 1,773 at the 2020 census. It was originally named "Sour Lake Springs", after the sulphurous spring water that flowed into the nearby lake. The city is part of the Beaumont–Port Arthur Metropolitan Statistical Area. Sour Lake is the oldest surviving town in Hardin County. It is called by some the "Gateway to the Big Thicket".

History

Sour Lake was first settled around 1835 when the Mexican state of Coahuila y Tejas granted Stephen Jackson one league of land covering  by land grant. Sam Houston visited Sour Lake in his later years. The town is home to one of the biggest sinkholes in Texas.

Sour Lake became a short-lived boomtown with the discovery of oil in 1901, shortly after oil was found at the nearby Spindletop salt dome. It is known as the birthplace of Texaco. Formed in 1903, the Texas Company (Texaco's former corporate name) is one of the three major oil companies that can trace its origins to the oil fields around Southeast Texas. Today the Sour Lake oilfield is the oldest continuously producing oil field in the world.

The town of Atcheson in Bruce McCandless's 2012 novel Sour Lake appears to be based at least loosely on the real Sour Lake. Atcheson, like the real-life Sour Lake, is situated in the Big Thicket and experienced a short-lived oil boom in early years of the 20th century. Yvette Benavides, in a San Antonio Express-News review of the book, noted, "There is a lot that is historically factual in this novel. That's part of the fun of reading Sour Lake."

The Ecuadorian jungle town commonly referred to as Lago Agrio was named after Sour Lake by Texaco when the company established the oil-producing settlement. Lago Agrio is Spanish for "Sour Lake". The official name of the Ecuadorian town is Nueva Loja.

Geography

Sour Lake is in southern Hardin County at the intersection of state highways 105 and 326. Highway 105 leads west  to Cleveland, Texas, and east  to the US 69 freeway in the northern part of Beaumont. Highway 326 leads north  to Kountze, the Hardin county seat, and south  to U.S. Route 90 at Nome.

Demographics

As of the 2020 United States census, there were 1,773 people, 820 households, and 620 families residing in the city.

As of the census of 2000, there were 1,667 people, 672 households, and 446 families residing in the city. The population density was 964.0 people per square mile (372.0/km). There were 752 housing units at an average density of 434.9 per square mile (167.8/km). The racial makeup of the city was 94.36% White, 3.18% African American, 0.36% Native American, 0.42% Asian, 0.42% from other races, and 1.26% from two or more races. Hispanic or Latino of any race were 3.00% of the population.

There were 672 households, out of which 31.4% had children under the age of 18 living with them, 52.8% were married couples living together, 9.7% had a female householder with no husband present, and 33.6% were non-families. 31.4% of all households were made up of individuals, and 17.9% had someone living alone who was 65 years of age or older. The average household size was 2.48 and the average family size was 3.15.

In the city, the population was spread out, with 27.5% under the age of 18, 6.8% from 18 to 24, 27.4% from 25 to 44, 21.9% from 45 to 64, and 16.5% who were 65 years of age or older. The median age was 38 years. For every 100 females, there were 92.7 males. For every 100 females age 18 and over, there were 88.0 males.

The median income for a household in the city was $30,300, and the median income for a family was $39,605. Males had a median income of $36,406 versus $24,500 for females. The per capita income for the city was $15,497. About 8.5% of families and 12.7% of the population were below the poverty line, including 14.1% of those under age 18 and 15.6% of those age 65 or over.

Education

Sour Lake is served by the Hardin-Jefferson Independent School District.

References

External links
 
 City of Sour Lake official website
 A Guide to the Oral History of the Texas Oil Industry, 1952–1958
 1901 map of Spindletop & Sour Lake Oilfields

Cities in Hardin County, Texas
Cities in Texas
Beaumont–Port Arthur metropolitan area